M.O.P. (short for Mash Out Posse) is an American hip hop duo composed of East Coast rappers Billy Danze and Lil' Fame. The song "Ante Up", was released on their Warriorz album in 2000. The group has frequently collaborated with DJ Premier. Fame sometimes produces under the moniker Fizzy Womack and has produced a significant number of tracks on all M.O.P. releases since 1996's Firing Squad, as well as work for other artists including Kool G Rap, Teflon and Wu-Tang Clan.

Origin
Lil' Fame (Jamal Grinnage; born April 9, 1975) and Billy Danze (Eric Murray; born November 15, 1971) grew up together in the neighborhood of Brownsville, Brooklyn, New York City, New York. They formed a street gang called Mash Out Posse. They later formed a hip hop duo and took their gang name of Mash Out Posse. It is thought that Fame choose to express himself through music after his older brother was shot to death in his neighbourhood.

Rise to fame
After contributing to the 1992 compilation The Hill That's Real, M.O.P. debuted in 1993 with the single "How About Some Hardcore?", which appeared on the soundtrack for the film House Party 3. The underground success of the single, promoted by a low-budget video from then-unknown director Hype Williams, led to their debut album To the Death. It was released in 1994 on the small label Select Records, almost fully produced by DR Period.

In 1996, M.O.P. released their second effort, Firing Squad. Hoping for better promotion, they signed with Relativity Records. Changing record labels and production duties to include Gang Starr's DJ Premier and Lil' Fame himself, the group still kept their energetic style and gained a slightly larger following this time round. In 1998 M.O.P. released the Handle Ur Bizness EP, which was soon followed by the album First Family 4 Life. Working with the same formula, again with a heavy percentage of the record produced by DJ Premier and Lil' Fame, the album featured guest appearances by Guru of Gang Starr, Treach of Naughty by Nature, OC of Diggin' in the Crates Crew and Jay-Z. The album had the dubious distinction of being the most stolen album from New York City's HMV stores in 1998.

M.O.P.'s fan base was loyal but remained rather small until 2000, when they released Warriorz, this time on Loud Records. Mainstream radio began playing the first single, "Ante Up", produced by DR Period, with whom they had not worked with since their debut. The single was a hit and propelled the album to #25 on the Billboard 200 chart. The follow-up single, the self-produced "Cold As Ice" (which featured a sample from "Cold As Ice" by Foreigner), also received radio airplay, although several of the song's lyrics had to be censored for the radio version. It was used in the UK on a TV advert for Ice White toothpaste. Both "Ante Up" and "Cold as Ice" reached the top ten on the UK Singles Chart peaking at #7 and #4 respectively. In 2001, M.O.P. collaborated with Krumbsnatcha to make the song "W.O.L.V.E.S.", which appeared on the soundtrack for the film Training Day.

In 2001, a remix of "Ante Up" was released featuring Busta Rhymes, Remy Ma, and Teflon, which was also very well received. That same year, they collaborated on a song titled "Life is Good" with the pop group LFO. The song reached #40 on Billboard'''s Hot Singles Sales chart. Both singles continued the Posse's long-awaited mainstream success.

In 2002, Loud Records folded, leaving the group stranded. In 2003, Loud's parent label Sony/Columbia issued a greatest hits album titled 10 Years and Gunnin'. M.O.P. later joined Jay-Z and Damon Dash's Roc-A-Fella Records. Their first recording for the label was a guest appearance on Jay-Z's album The Blueprint 2: The Gift & the Curse; they were set to release their album titled Ghetto Warfare, but the eagerly anticipated album was shelved. Two other albums were recorded: one titled The Last Generation, and the other titled Kill Nigga Die Slo Bluckka Bluckka Bloaoow Blood Sweat Tears and We Out. A Dash-produced track "It's That Simple" with Spice Girl Victoria Beckham was created, and received a premiere on radio stations in July 2003. This generated mixed reviews and further criticism, with the feeling being that Beckham was far from convincing as an urban act.

During this waiting period, the group kept busy by releasing a slew of mixtapes and appearing on soundtracks to films such as Bad Boys II. They also contributed two songs ("Ground Zero" and "Put it in the Air") to the videogame NFL Street 2, and another ("Fire") to Fight Night 2004, another video game. They also contributed Ante Up to the third installment of the popular Midnight Club video game series. Also, in 2004, M.O.P. joined the American rap rock band Linkin Park on the second stage of the Projekt Revolution Tour.

The group also released a mixtape called Marxmen Cinema (under the name The Marxmen), as well as a self-titled rap rock album (under the name Mash Out Posse) recorded as a collaboration with heavy metal group Shiner Massive. In 2004, Damon Dash sold his share of Roc-A-Fella to new Def Jam president, Jay-Z, and kept M.O.P. on his new label, Dame Dash Music Group. The group was left feeling uncomfortable with the situation. They announced their departure from Roc-A-Fella and Dame Dash in May 2005.

Since 2005
In June 2005, M.O.P. officially announced their signing with 50 Cent's G-Unit Records, around the same time as Queens rap duo Mobb Deep.  The duo completed a song with 50 Cent which was featured on the [[Get Rich or Die Tryin' (soundtrack)|Get Rich or Die Tryin' soundtrack]] entitled "When Death Becomes You", and also contributed their rap vocals in a remix of "I'll Whip Ya Head Boy". Months after the signing, M.O.P. released a compilation album entitled M.O.P. Salutes the St. Marxmen, consisting of several tracks recorded while the group was signed to Roc-A-Fella. In July 2006, M.O.P released the long-shelved Ghetto Warfare.

In February 2008, M.O.P. left G-Unit Records, due to creative differences. Billy and Fame released their next album, The Foundation, in 2009 on E1 Music. The album featured production from DJ Premier, Statik Selektah, The Alchemist, and Jake One, and guest appearances from Heltah Skeltah, Busta Rhymes, Jadakiss, Beanie Sigel, Styles P and Redman. The first single from the album, "Blow the Horns" featuring Busta Rhymes, and another track called "Street Life," which is a collaboration with dancehall artist Demarco, was released on the internet.

On October 14, 2008, M.O.P. filed suit in a New York Federal Court against World Wrestling Entertainment (WWE) and John Cena. The group claims that Cena and the WWE stole parts of their song "Ante Up" for Cena's theme song "The Time is Now". The theme song is also featured as the first track on Cena's album You Can't See Me. M.O.P. is seeking the destruction of the song and asking for $150,000 in damages. The lawsuit has since been dropped, it is unknown if a settlement was reached outside of court.

In June 2009, with extensive production from Lil' Fame (as Fizzy Womack) and a historic guest-list (Masta Ace, Kool G Rap, Sadat X), the RZA-executive produced "Wu-Tang Chamber Music" debuted in the Top 50 within its first week.  M.O.P. themselves appeared on the album cut "Ill Figures" alongside Raekwon and Kool G Rap.

Lil' Fame produced the 2011 Wu-Tang Clan compilation Legendary Weapons alongside Noah Rubin and Andrew Kelley.

On October 24, 2011, M.O.P. released "Get Yours", their first single from their collaborative album Sparta with the German production team Snowgoons, on Babygrand Records.

Lil Fame and Termanology teamed up on a collaborative album, Fizzyology. It was released on November 6, 2012 via Brick Records.

On November 18, 2014, M.O.P. released a new EP, Street Certified, on Nature Sounds. It is executive produced by DJ Premier and features guest appearances from Maino, Mobb Deep and Busta Rhymes. In 2019, M.O.P. released the single "Never Give Up" with DJ Tomekk.

DiscographyTo the Death (1994)Firing Squad (1996)First Family 4 Life (1998)Warriorz (2000)Marxmen Cinema (as The Marxmen) (2004)St. Marxmen (2005)Ghetto Warfare (2006)Foundation (2009)Sparta (2011) (with Snowgoons)Street Certified'' (2014)

References

External links

  official M.O.P website
 Interview on Mixery Raw Deluxe (February 2010)
 HipHopCanada.com Interview (April 2008)
 ItsHipHop.tv Video Interview
 Interview
 MOP discuss their future in an interview on Conspiracy Worldwide Radio September 2010

1993 establishments in New York City
African-American musical groups
American musical duos
Five percenters
G-Unit Records artists
Hip hop duos
Hip hop groups from New York City
Musical groups established in 1993
Musical groups from Brooklyn
Roc-A-Fella Records artists
Select Records artists
Hardcore hip hop groups
People from Brownsville, Brooklyn
Gang Starr Foundation members